Fencing competitions at the 2022 Bolivarian Games in Valledupar, Colombia were held from 23 (the day before the opening ceremony) to 28 June 2022 at the Gran Salón of the Club Campestre.

Twelve medal events were scheduled to be contested in the three disciplines of épée, foil and sabre. In each discipline an individual and a team event were held for each gender. A total of 114 athletes (57 per gender) competed in the events. The events were open competitions without age restrictions.

Venezuela were the fencing competitions defending champions having won them in the previous edition in Santa Marta 2017. Venezuela and hosts Colombia won 5 gold medals each, however Venezuela reached two more silver medals (6–4) than Colombia to win the Bolivarian fencing competitions again.

Participating nations
A total of 9 nations (all the 7 ODEBO nations and 2 invited) registered athletes for the fencing events. Each nation was able to enter a maximum of 24 athletes (12 per gender). Each nation could register a maximum of two athletes for the individual events and a team composed by a maximum of four athletes for the team events.

Venue
The fencing events were held at the Gran Salón of the Club Campestre located near the Balneario Hurtado in the north of Valledupar. The venue has a capacity for 500 people.

Medal summary

Medal table

Medalists

Men's events

Women's events

References

External links
Bolivarianos Valledupar 2022 Fencing

2022 Bolivarian Games
2022 in fencing
International fencing competitions hosted by Colombia